Robert L. Annis is an American musician and Dean and Director of Westminster College of the Arts of Rider University, which includes the Westminster Choir College.  Annis, a Grammy-nominated clarinetist, has performed with various orchestras throughout the country.  He serves as a member of Collage New Music, a chamber music organization based in Boston, and is a member of the Board of Trustees for the Princeton Symphony Orchestra in Princeton, New Jersey.  He has served as Dean of Enrollment at the New England Conservatory. A conservatory building was named in his honor at the USC Thornton School of Music.

Annis was previously a member of the San Antonio Symphony and on the faculty of Brown University.

Annis is an alumnus of New England Conservatory, Harvard University and the USC Thornton School of Music.

References
Collage Music Wire entry
Rider University bio of Annis

New England Conservatory alumni
USC Thornton School of Music alumni
Harvard University alumni
Brown University faculty
Rider University faculty
New England Conservatory faculty
Living people
Year of birth missing (living people)